Below is a list of historic homes in Carmel Point, Monterey County, California, USA.

Table key
 Listed as a California Historical Landmark

Historic Homes in Carmel Point

See also
 National Register of Historic Places listings in Monterey County, California
 California Historical Landmarks in Monterey County
 California Register of Historical Resources
 List of Historic Buildings in Carmel-by-the-Sea

References

External links
 Historic Preservation
 National Register Database and Research
 NPGallery Digital Asset Management System

Carmel-by-the-Sea, California
Buildings and structures in Monterey County, California